British International Investment, (formerly CDC Group plc, Commonwealth Development Corporation, and Colonial Development Corporation) is the development finance institution of the UK government. The Foreign, Commonwealth and Development Office is responsible for the organisation, and is the sole shareholder. It has an investment portfolio valued around US$7.1 billion (year-end 2020) and since 2011 is focused on the emerging markets of South Asia and Africa.

History

Formation
The original Colonial Development Corporation was established as a statutory corporation in 1948 by Clement Attlee's post-war Labour government, to assist British colonies in the development of agriculture. Following the independence of many colonies, it was renamed the Commonwealth Development Corporation in 1963 and was permitted to invest outside the Commonwealth in 1969.

As part of the Commonwealth Development Corporation Act 1999, CDC was converted from a statutory corporation to a public limited company renamed CDC Group plc, with all shares owned by the UK Government.

Actis spin-out
In July 2004 CDC spun out an emerging markets private equity fund manager, Actis Capital, with a 60% stake sold to the management team. CDC remained an active sponsor of Actis's investment activities, committing the equivalent of 650 million US dollars to the firm's third fund. Following its reorganisation, CDC ceased making direct investments and became purely a fund of funds investment company. During this period it grew in value from £1.2 billion to £2.8 billion, investing in almost 1000 businesses in 70 developing countries. These businesses employed almost a million people and paid over US$3 billion a year in taxes.

Criticisms of CDC
CDC was the subject of extensive investigations by the magazine Private Eye, which devoted seven pages to criticizing the organization in September 2010. Amongst other allegations, it claimed that CDC had moved away from financing beneficial international development towards seeking large profits from schemes that enriched CDC's managers while bringing little or no benefit to the poor; and that when Actis was spun out it was given an "implausibly low valuation". The Actis deal was also the subject of criticism by British politicians.

Review and reform
On 12 October 2010, the Secretary of State for International Development, Andrew Mitchell announced to Parliament that the British Government was to reconfigure CDC, saying that whilst he applauded its financial success, it had also "become less directly engaged in serving the needs of development". On 22 October 2010 the International Development Committee announced that it was to conduct an inquiry into CDC to examine issues such as its effectiveness and possible reforms, including its abolition. Their report was published on 3 March 2011 with the government's response delivered on 18 May 2011. In 2011 CDC implemented a new business plan, focusing its investments on the poorer countries of South Asia and sub-Saharan Africa, as well as once again providing direct investments to businesses alongside its fund of funds model.

2021 rename 

In November 2021, the FCDO announced that it would rebrand the CDC as British International Investment (BII) in 2022 as part of a strategy to deepen economic, security and development ties globally, increasing its financing to 9 billion pounds by 2025. Foreign Secretary Liz Truss said in the announcement the change was to "grow economies across Asia, Africa and the Caribbean while drawing them closer towards free-market democracies and building a network of liberty across the world". A group of NGOs and trade unions criticised the change as part of a move to "repurpose BII as an institution that focuses solely on private-sector investment and profit-making, rather than development goals and poverty reduction", and as part of offering an alternative to foreign partners to loans from China.

See also
 Department for International Development
 Development Finance Institution
 Actis Capital

References

External links

National Audit Office
CDC announces 2008 Annual Results

Foreign, Commonwealth and Development Office
Government-owned companies of the United Kingdom
Financial services companies of the United Kingdom
Development finance institutions
1948 establishments in the United Kingdom
British companies established in 1948
Companies based in London